The following are the winners of the 10th annual (1983) Origins Award, presented at Origins 1984:

Charles Roberts Awards

The H.G. Wells Awards

External links
 1983 Origins Awards Winners

1983 awards
1983 awards in the United States
Origins Award winners